The 2015 Brabantse Pijl was the 55th edition of the Brabantse Pijl road cycling race. Held on 15 April 2015, it started in Leuven and ended  later in Overijse. It was a 1.HC-ranked race that was part of the 2015 UCI Europe Tour. The main difficulty in the race was caused by 26 climbs, as well as twisting roads in the final part of the route.

The race was won from the breakaway by Ben Hermans. A group of fourteen riders finished two seconds behind, with Michael Matthews second and the defending champion Philippe Gilbert third.

Results

References

External links 

 

Brabantse Pijl
Brabantse Pijl
2015
Articles containing video clips